The 2011 Utah State Aggies football team represented Utah State University in the 2011 NCAA Division I FBS football season. The Aggies were led by third-year head coach Gary Andersen and played their home games at Merlin Olsen Field at Romney Stadium. They are members of the Western Athletic Conference. They finished the season 7–6, 5–2 in WAC play to finish in a tie for second place.

On November 28, The Aggies were invited to the Famous Idaho Potato Bowl which was the school's first bowl bid since 1997 which was in the same bowl game (known then as the Humanitarian Bowl). They lost the Famous Idaho Potato bowl to Ohio.

Before the Season

2011 Recruits

Roster

Schedule

Game Summaries

Auburn

Weber State

Colorado State

BYU

Wyoming

Fresno State

Louisiana Tech

Hawai'i

San Jose State

Idaho

Nevada

New Mexico State

Ohio

References

Utah State
Utah State Aggies football seasons
Utah State Aggies football